The People's Bank and Trust Company Building is an Art Deco skyscraper built in 1931 and located at 663 Main Avenue in the city of Passaic in Passaic County, New Jersey. It was added to the National Register of Historic Places on November 19, 2018, for its significance in architecture. Vacant since 1994, it is now owned by the Passaic Urban Enterprise Zone.

History and description
In 1930, People's Bank and Trust Company acquired three other banking institutions, the Hobart Trust Company, the City
Trust Company and the Merchants Bank of Passaic, and needed a new, larger building. The building was designed with Art Deco style by the architectural firm of Halsey, McCormack and Helmer based in New York City. They had previously designed the Williamsburgh Savings Bank Tower, also listed on the NRHP. The building was constructed by John W. Ferguson Company of Paterson. The first floor features storefronts, followed by an ashlar limestone section with large windows, and finally a yellow buff brick office tower. Originally 11-stories, a third floor mezzanine was added in 2016.

See also
National Register of Historic Places listings in Passaic County, New Jersey

References

Buildings and structures in Passaic, New Jersey
National Register of Historic Places in Passaic County, New Jersey
Bank buildings on the National Register of Historic Places in New Jersey
Skyscraper office buildings in New Jersey
Commercial buildings completed in 1931
1931 establishments in New Jersey
Art Deco architecture in New Jersey
New Jersey Register of Historic Places